Tales of Terror was a Sacramento, California hardcore punk band which was active from 1983 until 1986. Some, including Kurt Cobain and Mark Arm, cite Tales of Terror as a key inspiration for the then-burgeoning grunge scene.

History

After the dissolution of their previous band, the Square Cools, singer Pat "Rat’s Ass" Stratford and bassist Geoff "Dusty Coffin" Magner formed Tales of Terror with guitarist Lyon Wong and drummer Mike Hunter. A second guitarist, Steve "Capt. Trip Mender" Hunt, later joined the band.

By 1984 they were playing all over town and supporting big name punk acts like The Vandals, Dead Kennedys, and Fang.

Their one album, the self-titled effort Tales of Terror, was released in 1984 on the San Francisco indie label, CD Presents. Distribution was limited; it is estimated that fewer than 5000 copies were pressed.

However, the band's career came to an end on the night of January 5, 1986. Wong, the son of Chinese-American actor Victor Wong, died on a Midtown sidewalk of head trauma he suffered after being knocked to the curb during a late-night altercation. He was pronounced dead at 2:14 am, January 6, at Sutter General Hospital. Wong was 22 years old. The assailant, a minor,  received a 6-month sentence for manslaughter. The band opted not to continue without Lyon Wong. The various members drifted into other groups, most notably the Pirates of Venus, the Cactus Liquors and the Whorelords. The last time Pat Stratford, Steve "Capt. Trip Mender" Hunt, and Geoff Magner ever played on stage together was at the Trocadero in SF as an encore to a Hot Rod Shopping Cart show opening for Agent Orange with J Meraz on drums.

Legacy

Described by Midtown Monthly as "One of the most influential bands Sacramento ever produced" and often cited as the foundation of the grunge movement, their blend of hardcore, psychedelia, and rock had a lasting impact on music fans around the country, including Green River and Nirvana frontman Kurt Cobain. In Exclaim! magazine Mudhoney’s Mark Arm (whose earlier band Green River covered Tales' "Ozzy" on their 1987 Dry As a Bone EP) listed some of their gigs as the most inspirational he had seen. Dave Chavez of Verbal Abuse said, "With the right management and maybe a little bit of rehab here and there, Tales of Terror probably would have been the Nirvana and broke. If it wasn’t for the murder of Lyon Wong."

Members
Pat Stratford - vocals (1982 - 1986)
Lyon Wong - guitar (1982 - 1986; died 1986)
Steve Hunt - guitar (1982 - 1986)
Geoff Magner - bass (1982 - 1986)
Mike Hunter - drums (1982 - 1986)

Discography

Studio albums

Compilation appearances

See also

List of hardcore punk bands

Notes

References

Hardcore punk groups from California
Musical groups established in 1982
Musical groups disestablished in 1986
Musical groups from Sacramento, California
Skate punk groups
1982 establishments in California